Oi or OI may refer to:

In biology
 Grey-faced petrel, also known by its Māori name oi
 Orthostatic intolerance, a disorder of the autonomic nervous system
 Osteogenesis imperfecta, a group of genetic bone disorders

In business
 Oi (telecommunications), the largest landline telephone company in Brazil
 Operational intelligence, in business analytics
 Organizational intelligence, in business manage

In linguistics
 Oi (digraph), a Latin-script digraph
 Oi (interjection), an interjection used to get someone's attention, or to express surprise or disapproval
 Oi language, a Mon–Khmer dialect cluster of southern Laos
 Gha, a letter (Ƣ ƣ) erroneously referred to by Unicode as "oi"

In music
 Oi!, a subgenre of punk rock
 "Oi!" (song), a 2002 hit song for British grime music crew More Fire Crew

Organisations
 Oi! (Hong Kong), a visual arts organisation in Hong Kong
 Oi (Indonesia), an Iwan Fals fanbase foundation in Indonesia
 Oriental Institute (disambiguation)
 Orphans International, a global charitable organization that benefits orphans and abandoned children

Other uses
 Japanese cruiser Ōi	
 O-I, a Japanese tank design of the Second World War

See also
 Ōi (disambiguation), a number of places in Japan and the name of a light cruiser launched in 1920
 Aussie Aussie Aussie, Oi Oi Oi, an Australian chant
 Oi Oi Oi (album), an album by Boys Noize
 Oy (disambiguation)
 Hoy (disambiguation)